Second-seeded Nancye Wynne defeated Emily Hood Westacott 6–3, 5–7, 6–4, in the final to win the women's singles tennis title at the 1937 Australian Championships.

Seeds
The seeded players are listed below. Nancye Wynne is the champion; others show the round in which they were eliminated.

 Joan Hartigan (quarterfinals)
 Nancye Wynne (champion)
 Thelma Coyne (semifinals)
 Nell Hopman (second round)
 May Hardcastle (second round)
 Dorothy Stevenson (semifinals)
 Emily Hood Westacott (finalist)
 Gwen O'Halloran (second round)

Draw

Key
 Q = Qualifier
 WC = Wild card
 LL = Lucky loser
 r = Retired

Finals

Earlier rounds

Section 1

Section 2

External links
 

1937 in women's tennis
1937
1937 in Australian women's sport
Women's Singles